Basil Payne  (23 June 1923 — 6 January 2012) was an Irish poet and lecturer.

Life
Payne was educated at Synge Street CBS and University College Dublin. In the 1960s he presented a number of lectures and poetry readings in Dublin including a one-man show at the Gate Theatre. In 1964 and 1966, he won the Guinness International poetry prize.

From 1972 to 1978 he lectured in literature at several universities in the USA. His published work amounts to three books and several inclusions in anthologies of Irish poetry. His first book, "Sunlight on a Square", and his final book, "Dark and Light Fantastic", are available in Amazon kindle digital format as is a collection of his Irish Times newspaper articles from the 1960s to the 1980s.

Published works
 Sunlight on a Square (Dublin, John Augustin, 1961, republished on Amazon Kindle, 2012);
 Love in the Afternoon (Dublin, Gill and MacMillan, 1971);
 Another Kind of Optimism (Dublin, Gill and MacMillan, 1974);
 Dark and Light Fantastic (Amazon Kindle, 2013)

References

External links
Basil Payne website
Profile, Ricorso.net 
Basil Payne obituary, IrishTimes.com
Basil Payne obituary, Guardian.co.uk
Basil Payne obituary, TheStage.co.uk

1923 births
2012 deaths
Alumni of University College Dublin
Irish poets
20th-century poets
People educated at Synge Street CBS
Irish expatriates in the United States